Augment is the second studio album by American progressive metalcore band Erra. It was released on October 29, 2013, through Tragic Hero Records and was produced by Brian Hood. It is their last album with original vocalist Garrison Lee and guitarist Alan Rigdon, and their first with bassist Sean Price after Adam Hicks' departure. It is also their first album to chart.

Track listing

Personnel
Credits retrieved from AllMusic.

Erra
 Garrison Lee – unclean vocals
 Jesse Cash – guitar, bass, clean vocals, backing unclean vocals
 Alan Rigdon – guitar, bass, backing unclean vocals
 Sean Price – bass 
 Alex Ballew – drums

Additional musicians
 Trevor Hinesley – additional vocals
 Tyler Riley – additional vocals
 Leslie Thompson – additional vocals

Additional personnel
 Brian Hood – production, engineering, mastering, mixing, recording
 Aaron Marsh – artwork, design
 Luis Lopez Descartes – band photography

Charts

References

2013 albums
Erra (band) albums
Tragic Hero Records albums